Walter Francis Brown (10 January 1853 Providence, Rhode Island, – 7 November 1929 Venice, Italy) was an American painter and illustrator.

Career 
Walter Francis Brown was born to the marriage of Samuel Welch Brown (1824–1907) and Mary Elizabeth Thurber (1827–1912). He earned a Bachelor of Philosophy degree from Brown University in 1873. He continued his studies in Paris at the École des Beaux-Arts with Jean-Léon Gérôme (1824–1904) and Léon Bonnat (1833–1922). Brown then moved to Venice, established a studio at Palazzo da Mula, and specialized, among other things, painting city views. He illustrated books, including Settlement of Rhode Island (1874), by Charles Thurber Miller (1828–1876), and A Tramp Abroad (1889), by Mark Twain. He also contributed to Harper's Weekly, Leslie's, and St. Nicholas. Much of Brown's work is held by Brown University at the John Hay Library.

Selected work

Gallery

Family 
Brown, in 1885, married Louise Tifft Beckwith (1854–1932). His younger brother, Arthur Lewis Brown (1854–1928), was, from 1896 to 1927, United States district judge of the United States District Court for the District of Rhode Island. They both are nephews of naturalist and writer George Thurber (1821–1890).

Extended family and distant ancestors 
Walter Franics Brown was a 5th great-grandson of Rev. Chad Brown, the progenitor of the Brown family of Rhode Island.

Brown was a first cousin – 3 times removed – of the four brothers who were instrumental in relocating Brown University to Providence and securing its endowment: (i) Nicholas Brown (1729–1791), (ii) Joseph Brown (1733–1785), (iii) John Brown (1736–1803), and (iv) Moses Brown (1738–1836). One of Nicholas's sons, Nicholas Brown, Jr. (1769–1841) is the university's namesake.

Bibliography

Notes

References 

 
 
 ( via Library of Congress); ; .
 
 
  .
   ;  & .(see bound cover at Museum of Fine Arts, Boston)
 
 

1853 births
1929 deaths
19th-century American artists
20th-century American artists
American illustrators
American caricaturists
American children's book illustrators
Artists from Providence, Rhode Island
Brown University alumni
Artists from Venice
Walter Francis Brown